Chamberlain House may refer to:


Places and structures

Canada
 Chamberlain House (Ottawa, Ontario), a designated heritage property in Ottawa, Ontario

Scotland
 Chamberlain's House, a listed historical building (Category A) in Inveraray

United States
(by state then city)

 Cyrus C. Chamberlain House, Southington, Connecticut, a contributing property in the Southington Center Historic District, which is listed on the NRHP in Connecticut
 Chamberlain House (Honolulu, Hawaii), Honolulu, Hawaii, listed on the NRHP in Hawaii and part of the Mission Houses Museum
 Chamberlain-Bordeau House, Southbridge, Massachusetts, NRHP-listed
 Samuel Chamberlain House, Stoneham, Massachusetts, NRHP-listed
 Charles Chamberlain House, Worcester, Massachusetts, NRHP-listed
 Chamberlain-Flagg House, Worcester, Massachusetts, NRHP-listed
 H. S. M. Spielman House, Tekamah, Nebraska, also known as Chamberlain House, NRHP-listed
 Benjamin Chamberlain House, Johnstown, New York, NRHP-listed
 Daniel Chamberlain House, Newark Valley, New York, NRHP-listed
 George Earle Chamberlain House (disambiguation), two different houses in Oregon, both listed on the NRHP
 Frank Chamberlain Clark House, Medford, Oregon, NRHP-listed
 Chamberlain-Pennell House, Media, Pennsylvania, NRHP-listed
 Bowman-Chamberlain House, Kanab, Utah, NRHP-listed
 West Chester (Des Moines, Iowa), Des Moines, Iowa, also known as D.S. Chamberlain House, and Wesley Acres, NRHP-listed

See also
 Chamberlin House (disambiguation)